Giovanni Gualdi (born 25 November 1979) is a former Italian male long-distance runner who competed at three editions of the IAAF World Cross Country Championships at senior level (2000, 2005, 2006). He won one national championships at senior level (marathon: 2011).

References

External links
 

1979 births
Living people
Italian male long-distance runners
Athletics competitors of Fiamme Gialle
Italian male cross country runners